The men's 4 × 100 metres relay event at the 1928 Olympic Games took place between August 4 & August 5.

Results

Heats

Heat 1

Key: Q = Qualified

Heat 2

Key: Q = Qualified

Heat 3

Key: DSQ = Disqualified, Q = Qualified

Final

Key: DSQ = Disqualified, =WR = Equalled world record

References

Men's 4x100 metre relay
Relay foot races at the Olympics
4 × 100 metres relay
Men's events at the 1928 Summer Olympics